Sliema Hotsticks Hockey Club are one of the oldest field hockey clubs active in Malta. Originating from the town of Sliema the club is known for being one of the strongest and most successful clubs in Malta. 

Hotsticks are the ranked as the best hockey club in Malta after being crowned National League Champions during the 2021/22 season. Their ethos is playing fast, dynamic hockey that is exciting to watch.

They are known for excelling in youth development and have produced many hockey players who go on to play for the Maltese National Team. They currently play in the top tier of the Maltese National Hockey League.

History
Hotsticks originated in December 1975 when Tony Caruana Smith, then teacher at Naxxar Boys Secondary School, gathered a group of 11-year-old schoolboys and started showing them the basic skills of hockey.

Only Juniors
In May 1977, Hotsticks Hockey Team took part in the first official HAM competition, entering two teams in an under-18 six-a-side full-pitch tournament. These Hotsticks teams were made up of under 16/14 players. Ten teams had participated in this tournament.

From then on Hotsticks competed regularly in all junior leagues and tournaments. In their first participation in junior leagues, in season 1977/78, Hotsticks won the under-14 league and were runners-up at under-16, losing only in the final to La Salle College. The competition included 8 teams while Hotsticks player David Xuereb won the HAM junior player of the year that season.

Senior National League

In season 1980/81, Hotsticks took part for the first time in the Senior National League. In the first two seasons the team placed last and penultimate, but enthusiasm was abounding.

In 1982/83, Hotsticks obtained 3rd place and took part in the Young Stars International tournament.

The following season, 1983/84, Hotsticks surprised all by winning the National Championship for the first time. All the players were under 20 years of age except for two.

After this glorious season, all ties with Young Stars Hockey Club were ended and Hotsticks established its own independent Club. Later the name Sliema was added to the club name to add more prestige and also because the founder and many of the original players hailed from Sliema and vicinities. There was also a significant period when the club had its clubhouse at Tigne Sliema.

Present Day

Indoor Hockey
The club were crowned champions of the final indoor league in 2014/15 and went on to compete in the EHF Indoor Championships in Gabrovo, Bulgaria.

9 a-side League
Hotsticks are currently the Maltese reigning champions of the 9-a-side league.

Challenge Cup
Sliema Hotsticks emerged as winners of the 2015 Knock Out Trophy after beating Qormi HC 3 – 2. The goals came all in the second half with Steve Portelli claiming his first hat-trick in a final. The two teams won their respective semi-finals against White Hart and Rabat respectively.

Hotsticks were also crowned champions of the Challenge Cup in the 2020/21 season, beating Qormi in the final.

National League
The 2021–22 National League was the 53rd season of the National League, the top Maltese league for field hockey clubs since its establishment in 1968. The season was initially scheduled to start on 20th December 2021 but this was delayed until 30 January 2022 as a consequence of the postponement of the previous season's conclusion due to the COVID-19 pandemic.

On April 24th 2022 Hotsticks secured a fifth National League title with one match to spare.

European Competition
Sliema Hotsticks became the 2nd Maltese club to represent Malta in the European competitions organised by the European Hockey Federation. Hotsticks successfully organised the last ever EuroHockey Cup Winners Challenge II in Malta in 2007. The tournament was hailed as a big success and the Hotsticks team just failed to reach the semi-finals and finished in 5th place.

Hotsticks have continued to regularly compete in Euro Hockey club events.

2021/22 Squad

Coaches
 Luke Mallia

Notable Past Players
 David Xuereb
 Keith Vella
 Andre Imbroll
 Gaetano Vella

See also
Maltese National Hockey League
European Hockey Federation
Qormi Hockey Club

References

External links
Sliema Hotsticks Official Website
Field Hockey Forum
The FIH – the game's international governing body
European Hockey Federation

Field hockey clubs in Malta
1975 establishments in Malta
Field hockey clubs established in 1975
Sliema